Storm Mountain may refer to:

Canada
 Storm Mountain (Misty Range), a mountain in the Misty Range of Banff National Park, Alberta
 Storm Mountain (Ball Range), a mountain on the Continental Divide and British Columbia-Alberta border in the Canadian Rockies

Falkland Islands
 Storm Mountain, Falkland Islands, (West Falkland)

United States
 Storm Mountain (Montana), a mountain in Stillwater County, Montana

See also
Storm Peak, Ross Dependency, Antarctica
Mount Storm (disambiguation)